Yang Wanli (or Yang Wan-Li) (楊萬里) (1127–1206), Courtesy name Yanxiu (延秀), was a Chinese poet and politician, born in Jishui, Jizhou (today Jishui County, Jiangxi). He was one of the "four masters" of the Southern Song Dynasty poetry. 

Written during the final exile of the Song to Hangzhou, the poems celebrate the beauties and mysteries of nature, flora and fauna, much as the famed Song painters did. But they also querulously and wittily illuminate the annoyances and pleasures of everyday life.

He passed his jinshi exams in 1154 (24th year of the Shaoxing era) and served a number of minor official posts in the Song Dynasty.

See also
Huang Tingjian

Sources 

 Yang Wanli

1127 births
1206 deaths
12th-century Chinese poets
13th-century Chinese poets
Poets from Jiangxi
Politicians from Ji'an
Song dynasty poets
Song dynasty politicians from Jiangxi